Here Comes the Sun is a 1993 science-fiction comedy novel by Tom Holt. The book was published in the UK by Orbit Books and is Holt's first comic science fiction novel.

Plot introduction
Mechanical failures begin to trouble the Sun, making it hard for its driver to complete his rounds. The sun is in need of maintenance, and other things are breaking down all over the universe. Fresh ideas are needed. Jane, a mortal and a management trainee, is brought in the sort it all.

Reception
Critical reception for the novel was mixed, with SF Crowsnest praising Holt's dialogue, saying he has "the ability to make the reader laugh out loud and should be treasured".

Footnotes

References

1993 British novels
British fantasy novels
British comedy novels
Novels by Tom Holt
Orbit Books books